Porthmadog Urban District was an urban district of Caernarfonshire, Wales. It was initially known as Ynyscynhaiarn Urban District (1894-1915) before becoming Porthmadog Urban District (1915–74). It was administered by an urban district council. Porthmadog Urban District was absorbed into Dwyfor in 1974.

References

1974 disestablishments in Wales
Urban districts of Wales
Caernarfonshire
Porthmadog